Charles Smith (24 August 1861 – 2 May 1925) was an English cricketer who played for Lancashire between 1893 and 1902.

Career
Smith made his first-class debut against Nottinghamshire at Trent Bridge on 15 June 1893. He played 168 matches for Lancashire with his last match on 14 July 1902 versus Worcestershire at the County Ground, Worcester.

In 1903, Lancashire held a benefit season for Smith which raised £657 shared jointly with Willis Cuttell.

References

1861 births
1925 deaths
Cricketers from Leeds
English cricketers
Lancashire cricketers
English cricketers of 1890 to 1918
People from Calverley
Wicket-keepers